The 2nd Lombank Trophy was a motor race, run to Formula One rules, held on 26 March 1961 at Snetterton Motor Racing Circuit, England. The race was run over 37 laps of the circuit, and was won by Australian driver Jack Brabham in a Cooper T53. 

This was the first Formula One event in Europe to be run to the new 1.5 litre rules, and the field was bolstered by a number of Intercontinental Formula cars, i.e. cars that conformed to the old 2.5 litre Formula One. Only two of the Intercontinental Formula cars finished the race, but they were a lap ahead of the other finishers. Some of the cars conforming to the new Formula One regulations were converted Formula Two cars.

Results
''Note: a blue background indicates an Intercontinental Formula entrant.

References
 Results at Silhouet.com 
 "The Grand Prix Who's Who", Steve Small, 1995.
 "The Formula One Record Book", John Thompson, 1974, pp 10–11.

Lombank Trophy
Lombank Trophy
Lombank